The 2022–23 Scottish Women's Football Championship is the fourth season of the SWF Championship, the present third-tier division of women's football in Scotland. Due to league restructuring by Scottish Women's Football (SWF) after the 2021–22 season, there is a national eight-club Championship division and, one level below, a new fourth league tier, Scottish Women's Football League One, with 12 clubs (initially 14; two have withdrawn). The Scottish women's league last had four national divisions from 1999 to 2004.

Most of the competing clubs have moved from last season's Championship North and Championship South divisions. Those North/South divisions have been discontinued after three seasons. Twelve of the initial 14 clubs who entered League One were effectively relegated in 2022, by moving to the level 4 division from level 3. The regional Scottish Women's Football League was demoted to level 5. The SWFL's most successful club in recent years, Bishopton, joined League One for 2022–23, but withdrew before the season kicked off, as did Buchan Ladies.

Two clubs will be promoted from League One in 2022–23, and none relegated from the Championship. Each division's season will kick off on 14 August 2022. The season is scheduled to finish on 16 April 2023 in the Championship.

Overview
In the 2021–22 Championship, three of the 26 entrant clubs won promotion to SWPL 2 (Montrose, Gartcairn and East Fife). Four clubs withdrew during the 2021–22 season: United Glasgow, Dunfermline Athletic (moved to SWFL), Stonehaven (moved to SWFL), and Clyde Ladies FC folded in protest when Clyde F.C. re-signed David Goodwillie, who was found guilty of rape by a civil court in 2017.

The 2022–23 Championship has two clubs from the former Championship North and six from the South. In 2022–23 League One initially had four clubs from the North and eight from the South. Two clubs joined League One from outwith the Championship: Bishopton (from the SWFL)  and Giffnock SC Women (founded in 1995 as a youth football club). In July 2022, Bishopton and Buchan were withdrawn from League One before the division's fixture list was published. Buchan were a former Championship North club, from Maud, Aberdeenshire.

The Championship clubs will play against each other four times, totalling 28 matches per side, starting on 14 August 2022 and ending on 16 April 2023. League One is scheduled to play a double round-robin of the 12 clubs, each team playing 22 matches, concluding on 26 March 2023; that will be followed by a divisional "split" in League One, and an extra round-robin: "the league will split after teams have played each other home and away into a top six and bottom six for one remaining round". The late change of format was necessitated by the withdrawal of Bishopton and Buchan from League One.

The nationalised format was devised by SWF in reaction to the growth of women's football and to professionalise the sport. Clubs are admitted to the third and fourth tiers based on meeting criteria related to player welfare. The Scottish women's league last had four national divisions from 1999 to 2004: the Premier Division/Premier League, the SWFL First Division, Second Division, and Third Division. CEO Aileen Campbell of SWF said the Championship would be "an exciting and competitive contest among eight teams from right across Scotland".

Teams

Championship

League One

Withdrawn clubs (League One):

References

External links
 Scottish Women's Football (SWF)

Scot
Scottish Women's Football Championship seasons
Championship